
The French Player of the Year is an association football award presented annually by the French magazine France Football since 1959. Originally, only French players playing in France were eligible, but from 1996 French players playing abroad were in contention to win the trophy. Since 2001, former winners elect the player of the year.

Winners

Player of the Century
At the end of the 20th century, the magazine also voted on the French Player of the Century, won by Michel Platini.

Manager of the Year
Every year, the magazine elects the best French manager of the year. The jury is composed of former laureates.

1970: Albert Batteux
1970: Mario Zatelli
1971: Kader Firoud
1971: Jean Prouff
1972: Jean Snella
1973: Robert Herbin
1974: Pierre Cahuzac
1975: Georges Huart
1976: Robert Herbin
1977: Pierre Cahuzac
1978: Gilbert Gress
1979: Michel Le Millinaire
1980: René Hauss
1981: Aimé Jacquet
1982: Michel Hidalgo
1983: Michel Le Milinaire
1984: Aimé Jacquet
1985: Jean-Claude Suaudeau
1986: Guy Roux
1987: Jean Fernández
1988: Guy Roux
1989: Gérard Gili
1990: Henryk Kasperczak
1991: Daniel Jeandupeux
1992: Jean-Claude Suaudeau
1993: Jean Fernández
1994: Jean-Claude Suaudeau
1995: Francis Smerecki
1996: Guy Roux
1997: Jean Tigana
1998: Aimé Jacquet
1999: Élie Baup
2000: Alex Dupont
2001: Vahid Halilhodžić
2002: Jacques Santini
2003: Didier Deschamps
2004: Paul Le Guen
2005: Claude Puel
2006: Pablo Correa
2007: Pablo Correa
2008: Arsène Wenger
2009: Laurent Blanc
2010: Didier Deschamps 
2011: Rudi Garcia
2012: René Girard
2013: Rudi Garcia
2014: Rudi Garcia
2015: Laurent Blanc
2016: Zinedine Zidane
2017: Zinedine Zidane
2018: Didier Deschamps
2019: Christophe Galtier
2020: Not awarded due to the COVID-19 pandemic
2021: Christophe Galtier

See also
Onze d'Or (1976–present)

References

French football trophies and awards
Association football player of the year awards by nationality
France Football awards